The Paine Furniture Building is an historic commercial building at 75-81 Arlington Street in Boston, Massachusetts.  It occupies the entire block between St. James and Stuart Streets, and has a prominent position on Park Square.

The ten-story building was constructed in 1914 in a Classical Revival style, to a design by Densmore and LeClear.  It was designed to house the showrooms, offices, and manufacturing facilities of the Paine Furniture Company, at one time the largest furniture company in New England.  The company sold the building in 1989.  It has steel frame construction, and is faced in limestone.

The building was added to the National Register of Historic Places in 2002. It is currently a pending Boston Landmark. Suffolk University's New England School of Art and Design currently occupies part of the building.

See also 
 National Register of Historic Places listings in northern Boston, Massachusetts

References

Commercial buildings completed in 1914
Commercial buildings on the National Register of Historic Places in Massachusetts
Commercial buildings in Boston
Retail buildings in Massachusetts
National Register of Historic Places in Boston
1914 establishments in Massachusetts